Mélanie Marie Anna Noël-Bardis (born 13 May 1986 in Ambilly, France) is a French weightlifter. At the 2008 Summer Olympics, she competed in the women's 48 kg event, finishing in 7th place with a total of 177 kg. She competed at the 2012 Summer Olympics, also in the Women's 48 kg event, finishing in 10th place with a total of 166 kg.

References

Living people
Olympic weightlifters of France
Weightlifters at the 2008 Summer Olympics
Weightlifters at the 2012 Summer Olympics
French female weightlifters
1986 births
Sportspeople from Haute-Savoie
21st-century French women